Tigerland is a 2000 American war drama film directed by Joel Schumacher and starring Colin Farrell. It takes place in a training camp for soldiers to be sent to the Vietnam War.

Tigerland was the name of a U.S. Army training camp during the mid-1960s to early 1970s, located at Fort Polk, Louisiana as part of the U.S. Army Advanced Infantry Training Center. As often the last stop for new infantrymen on their way to Vietnam, Tigerland was established in humid and muggy Fort Polk in order to closely mimic the environmental conditions of South Vietnam. While the film's setting is loosely based on Fort Polk, the film was actually filmed at Camp Blanding in Florida. The film premiered at the 2000 Toronto International Film Festival.

Plot
In September 1971, the US is losing the Vietnam War. Roland Bozz, a draftee opposed to the war, is an unruly soldier who disrespects authority. He befriends another Army recruit, Jim Paxton, an aspiring writer who records his experiences in a journal. Unlike Bozz, Paxton volunteered. Upon reaching their post, company commanding officer Captain Saunders explains that every soldier who passes through Fort Polk will be sent to Vietnam, and that any political views on the war are irrelevant.

Having "X-ray vision for loopholes", Bozz finds ways for soldiers to get out of the army — one because he not only has children but also a disabled wife; another, Miter, had joined to prove his manhood but finds himself overwhelmed. Eventually Bozz's natural leadership and ability earn him the title of platoon guide. Another private, Wilson, a racial bigot and instigator, continuously demeans Miter and Bozz. Bozz fights and easily beats Wilson, earning Wilson's hatred.

Later, during live fire exercises, Wilson threatens Bozz with a pistol. Bozz tries to disarm Wilson, and the two wrestle each other to the ground, with Wilson prevailing and putting the gun to the back of Bozz's head and pulling the trigger. Miraculously, the gun misfires, saving Bozz's life. Saunders lets Bozz choose the punishment: have Wilson court-martialed or "let me deal with him", strongly suggesting the latter. Bozz says he wants Wilson "out of the Army", because he recognizes Wilson has emotionally suffered ever since his inability to command became obvious.

The platoon is sent to "Tigerland", a forested training area designed as a replica of Vietnam. During an exercise, Bozz's squad acts as villagers in a mock Vietnamese village, with one squad member designated as a Viet Cong sympathizer. They compete with another squad charged with rooting out the sympathizer, led by Wilson, who was ultimately spared. As the exercise ends with Bozz's squad "winning", Wilson tells Bozz he will kill him no matter what it takes. Soon thereafter, Bozz plans to escape to Mexico with the aid of some civilians he has paid. Platoon member Johnson tells him if he runs away, Wilson will kill Paxton instead. Bozz remains.

During the last training exercise, the two squads are pitted against each other on patrolling missions. As Wilson's squad prepares for an attack, he replaces his blank cartridges with live ammunition and removes his blank-firing adaptor. As Bozz's squad nears, he opens fire. Though he does not hit anyone, he is obviously using live ammunition, and the trainer for the exercise tries to intervene. As he does, Bozz is standing above Paxton and deliberately fires a blank round with his rifle muzzle near Paxton's face, the flash wounding Paxton's eye. The trainer aims a pistol at Wilson's head to get him to hold his weapon up and surrender, telling him he will be court-martialed.

The platoon prepares to head to Vietnam, except for Paxton, whose eye injury, though temporary, has earned him a medical discharge. Bozz and Paxton exchange farewells. Paxton tells Bozz he is going to write about him, but Bozz says he will not. He has stolen Paxton's journal and rips out pages as the platoon's bus drives off, leaving Paxton scrambling to recover them. Bozz tosses the journal as the bus speeds away.

In the closing narration, Paxton says he never saw Bozz again. Over time, he heard from various sources that Bozz either died in Vietnam or disappeared over there. One acquaintance told Paxton he thought he'd seen Bozz, years after the war, in Mexico with a beautiful woman.

Cast
 Colin Farrell as Private Roland Bozz
 Matthew Davis as Private Jim Paxton
 Clifton Collins Jr. as Private Miter
 Tom Guiry as Private Cantwell
 Shea Whigham as Private Wilson
 Russell Richardson as Private Johnson
 Cole Hauser as Staff Sergeant Cota
 Neil Brown Jr. as Private Jamoa Kearns
 Tory Kittles as Private Ryan
 Nick Searcy as Captain Saunders
 Afemo Omilami as Sergeant First Class Ezra Landers
 Matt Gerald as Sergeant Eveland
 Michael Shannon as Sergeant Filmore
 James Macdonald as Staff Sergeant Thomas
 Arian Ash as Sheri

Reception
Tigerland received positive reviews from critics and has a "certified fresh" rating of 77% on Rotten Tomatoes based on 47 reviews with an average score of 6.98 out of 10. The consensus states "A great cast and the gritty feel of the film help elevate Tigerland above the familiarity of the subject matter." The film also has a score of 55 out of 100 on Metacritic based on 14 reviews. Despite the positive critical reception and its US$10 million budget, the film hardly appeared at the box office, making $148,701 worldwide.

References

External links
 
 

2000 films
2000s English-language films
2000 drama films
2000s war drama films
20th Century Fox films
American war drama films
Films directed by Joel Schumacher
Films set in Louisiana
Films set in 1971
Films about the United States Army
Films shot in Jacksonville, Florida
American independent films
Vietnam War films
Regency Enterprises films
Films produced by Beau Flynn
Films produced by Steven Haft
Films produced by Arnon Milchan
2000s American films